Martina Stamm-Fibich (born 23 April 1965) is a German politician of the Social Democratic Party (SPD) who has been serving as a member of the Bundestag from the state of Bavaria since 2013.

Political career 
Stamm-Fibich first became a member of the Bundestag in the 2013 German federal election. She contested the constituency of Erlangen in 2009, 2013, 2017 and 2021. She was re-elected at the 2021 German federal election.

In parliament, Stamm-Fibich serves as member of the Committee on Health and the Committee on Petitions, where she serves as her parliamentary group's rapporteur on pediatrics, medical devices and patients' rights.

In addition to her committee assignments, Stamm-Fibich has been an alternate member of the German delegation to the Parliamentary Assembly of the Council of Europe (PACE) since 2022. In the Assembly, she serves on the Committee on Social Affairs, Health and Sustainable Development and the Sub-Committee on Children.

Within the SPD parliamentary group, Stamm-Fibich belongs to the Parliamentary Left, a left-wing movement.

References

External links 

  
 Bundestag biography 

1965 births
Living people
Members of the Bundestag for Bavaria
Female members of the Bundestag
21st-century German women politicians
Members of the Bundestag 2021–2025
Members of the Bundestag 2017–2021
Members of the Bundestag 2013–2017
Members of the Bundestag for the Social Democratic Party of Germany
People from Erlangen